Deric Bolton (1908–1993) was a Scottish research chemist and poet born in Paisley. He was an exponent of the exploration and elucidation of science through verse. His poetry collections include Glasgow Central Station (1972) and a volume of selected poems, August Morning on Tweed (Galliard, 1991). He lived most of his life in Edinburgh and was vice-chair of the Scottish Association for the Speaking of Verse.

References

Scottish chemists
1908 births
1993 deaths
20th-century Scottish poets
Scottish male poets
20th-century British male writers